The Army of the North or was one of the armies deployed by the United Provinces of the Río de la Plata in the Spanish American wars of independence.

Army of the North, Northern Army, or similar names may also refer to:

Current components of larger armies
 Northern Army (Japan)
 United States Army North
 Shan State Army - North,  Shan nationalist insurgent group in Myanmar (Burma)

Historical armies
 Army of the North (Ireland), a force of Irish Protestants raised in 1689 during the Williamite War
 Northern Army (Russia), a White force 1918-1920

Historical components of larger armies
 Army of the North (France), any of several historical units of the French Army 
 Army of the North (Spain), the Nationalist army that rose up and fought against the Second Spanish Republic during the Spanish Civil War.
 Armed Forces of the North (1976–1983), rebel army during the Chadian Civil War
 Northern District Army (Japan) (1940–1945), of the Imperial Japanese Army
 North Army (German Empire) (1914), during World War I
 Army Group North (1939–1945), German formation during World War II
 Northern Army Group (1952–1993), a NATO military formation during the Cold War
 Northern Group of Forces (1945-1993), Soviet formation during the Cold War.
 Northern Army (1895–1905), part of the British Indian Army's Northern Command

Northern armies in opposition to southern armies
 Union Army in the U.S. Civil War
 North Vietnam Army
 North Korea Army

See also
 Northern Command (disambiguation)
 División del Norte, faction in the Mexican Revolution 
 Division of the North, Spanish force in the Napoleonic Wars
 War in the North, Spanish Civil war
 Sudan People's Liberation Movement-North, insurgent group in Sudan